Araripina is a Brazilian municipality in the state of Pernambuco. Has an estimated population in 2020 of 84,864 inhabitants according with IBGE.  Total area of 1.847,5 km and is  located in the state mesoregion of Sertão, at 622 meters above the sea level and 683 km West from the state capital, Recife.
The exploration of gypsum (95% of the Brazilian reserves) and calcarium is the base of the local economy and at the homonymous microregion.

Geography

 State - Pernambuco
 Region - Sertao Pernambucano
 Boundaries - Ceará (N); Ouricuri  (S);  Ipubi and Trindade  (E);  Piaui (W)
 Area - 1847.5 km2
 Elevation - 622 m
 Hydrography - Brigida River
 Vegetation - Caatinga
 Climate - Semi desertic ( Sertao)- hot and dry
 Annual average temperature - 22.4 c
 Main road -  BR 232 and BR 316
 Distance to Recife - 683 km

Economy

The main economic activities in Araripina are based in extraction of gypsum and no metallic minerals; and primary sector especially creation of goats, donkeys, pigs and farms with beans, manioc and corn. Araripina is located in the microregion with its name, which contains 95% of the Brazilian reserves of Gypsum.

Economic Indicators

Economy by Sector
2006

Health Indicators

Sports
The main sports in Araripina is football which is represented by Araripina Futebol Clube, currently playing the Campeonato Pernambucano. Their stadium is known as Chapadão do Araripe which has 5000 seats.

Transportation
Araripina is served by Comte. Mairson C. Bezerra Airport.

References

Municipalities in Pernambuco